Eponymous tests are generally named after the person who first described the test.

See also
 List of eponymously named medical signs

References

Eponymous tests
Tests